Coore (also known as Coor) is a village in the parish of Kilmurry Ibrickane, near Mullagh and Milltown Malbay, in County Clare, Ireland. It is made up of two communities: Coore East and Coore West.

Coore West is split into two parts:
 Coore West (east) is the place where the local church is standing. "The Most Holy Redeemer" church is built in 1865-1866, by father Patrick Moran.
 Coore West (west) houses Coore National School and the former "Gleeson's Pub", playground of musicians like Kitty Hayes and Junior Crehan.

Wind farm
In 2011 a company proposed development of a wind farm in the vicinity of Coore. The local people were divided over the plan.

In popular culture
 Junior Crehan made a composition named The Hills of Coore

References

Towns and villages in County Clare